The 1902 TCU football team represented Texas Christian University (TCU) as an independent during the 1902 college football season. The school was renamed Texas Christian University in 1902 and was previously known as Add–Ran University. They played their home games in Waco, Texas.

Schedule

References

TCU
TCU Horned Frogs football seasons
College football winless seasons
TCU football